The Paris Protocols were an agreement between Nazi Germany and Vichy France negotiated in May 1941. Although not ratified, the protocols were implemented. Admiral François Darlan represented the French and the German ambassador to France, Otto Abetz, represented the Nazis. The Paris Protocols granted the Germans military facilities in Syria, Tunisia, and French West Africa. In exchange, the French received reduced occupation costs (down to 15 million Reichsmarks a day from 20 million), return of some 6,800 French experts from prisoner-of-war camps, and ease on the restrictions between "occupied France" and "unoccupied France."

The Paris Protocols are considered the highpoint of Vichy French collaboration with the Nazis. But Darlan wanted still better terms and ultimately the protocols lapsed.

See also
 Second Armistice at Compiègne
 Anglo-Iraqi War
 Syria–Lebanon Campaign
 Vichy France

Notes

References
 

Middle East theatre of World War II
Mediterranean theatre of World War II
Military history of France during World War II
Treaties of Vichy France
1941 in France
Treaties concluded in 1941
Unratified treaties
Treaties of Nazi Germany
France–Germany relations